Cyperus volckmannii is a species of sedge that is native to northern central parts of Chile.

See also 
 List of Cyperus species

References 

volckmannii
Plants described in 1865
Flora of Chile
Taxa named by Rodolfo Amando Philippi